Jean-Côme Noguès (born 28 February 1934) is a French children's author from Castelnaudary

References

Living people
1934 births
People from Castelnaudary
French children's writers